The 1970 ICF Canoe Sprint World Championships were held in Copenhagen, Denmark for the second time after hosting the event in 1950. This event was held under the auspices of the International Canoe Federation. Beginning at these championships, the event would be held on an annual basis in non-Summer Olympic years, a tradition that continues .

The men's competition consisted of four Canadian (single paddle, open boat) and nine kayak events. Three events were held for the women, all in kayak.

This was the eighth championships in canoe sprint.

Medal summary

Men's

Canoe

Kayak

Women's

Kayak

Medals table

References
ICF medalists for Olympic and World Championships - Part 1: flatwater (now sprint): 1936-2007.
ICF medalists for Olympic and World Championships - Part 2: rest of flatwater (now sprint) and remaining canoeing disciplines: 1936-2007.
 Results at Canoeresults.eu

Icf Canoe Sprint World Championships, 1970
Icf Canoe Sprint World Championships, 1970
ICF Canoe Sprint World Championships
International sports competitions hosted by Denmark
Canoeing in Denmark